Michel Azcueta (born 1947) is a Spanish-Peruvian teacher and politician. He was born in Madrid, Spain. Affiliated with the United Left party, he was mayor of Villa El Salvador District from 1984 to 1986, 1987–1990 and 1996–1998.

References 

1947 births
Living people
Mayors of places in Peru
United Left (Peru) politicians
Politicians from Madrid
Spanish emigrants to Peru